Alberto Rabagliati (27 June 1906 in Milan – 8 March 1974 in Rome) was an Italian jazz singer.

Early career
Alberto Rabagliati was born in Milan in 1906 and was the son of piedmontese spouses: his father Leandro Valentino Rabagliati and his mother Delfina Besso were both natives of Casorzo, a common on the hills of the Montferrat in the Province of Asti (Italy). In 1927, he moved to Hollywood as the winner of a Rudolph Valentino look-alike contest. He later recalled: "For someone like me, who had seen no more than Lake Como or Monza Cathedral so far, finding myself on board a luxury steamer with three cases full of clothes, a few rolls of dollars, grand-duchesses and countesses flirting with me was something extraordinary".  He remained in America for four years, but his career as an actor never took off. However, during his stay he had the opportunity to get to know new musical genres such as jazz, swing, and scat singing.

Alberto Rabagliati married Maria Antonietta Tonnini in Rome in 1954.

Singing 
Back in Europe, he became a singer. After a brief experience with Pippo Barzizza's orchestra, he joined the Lecuona Cuban Boys, a Cuban band. He performed with his face painted black and made a hit with the song "Maria la O".

While with the Lecuona Cuban Boys he met Giovanni D'Anzi who proposed him an audition with Italian state radio station EIAR. Rabagliati soon became a radio star, and in 1941 had his own radio show. Every Monday night EIAR (RAI) aired Canta Rabagliati ("Rabagliati sings"), with the singer presenting his most famous songs such as "Ma l'amore no", "Mattinata fiorentina", "Ba-Ba-Baciami Piccina", "Silenzioso slow", "Bambina innamorata".

He was so popular that his name was sung in the lyrics of La famiglia canterina, Quando canta Rabagliati, Quando la radio. At a time when anything foreign was banned, the idol Rabagliati was allowed to maintain his American-influenced style. Indeed, the Fascist government decided to make use of his popularity by choosing his song "Sposi (c'è una casetta piccina)" ("Wed (there's a little home)") as their demographic campaign anthem.

Acting 
His fame as a singer helped his acting career restart. From 1940 to 1965 he acted in some twenty films, including The Barefoot Contessa, Montecarlo and Il vedovo. In 1966, he starred in The Christmas That Almost Wasn't.

Rabagliati was active also on the stage until the mid-1950s. He performed in musical revues and comedies by Garinei and Giovannini.

His last public appearance was in 1974 as a guest in the TV show Milleluci hosted by Mazzini Mina and Raffaella Carrà. Soon afterward he died of cerebral thrombosis.

References

External links 
 

1906 births
1974 deaths
Singers from Milan
Italian male film actors
Neurological disease deaths in Lazio
Deaths from cerebral thrombosis
20th-century Italian male actors
Male actors from Milan
20th-century Italian male singers
Burials at the Cimitero Flaminio